James Brunton is a judge on the Quebec Superior Court who in late 2005 ruled that no restrictions should be placed upon Karla Homolka's freedom following the completion of her jail term earlier that year. He has an estimated net worth of 5 to 36,7million canadian dollars  In 2006 he refused to extradite eleven residents of Eastern Townships, Quebec to Vermont in the United States to face U.S. federal charges of conspiracy to traffic and import marijuana.

Brunton received his B.A. degree from McGill University in 1972 and his law degree from the same institution in 1977. He was appointed to the Superior Court in 2003, replacing Pierrette Rayle, who went on to the Court of Appeal. He also took part of a jury trial for Tony Accurso.

Notes

Lawyers from Montreal
Judges in Quebec
Living people
Anglophone Quebec people
McGill University Faculty of Law alumni
McGill University alumni
Place of birth missing (living people)
Year of birth missing (living people)